Battens Crossroads, also known as Union Academy, is an unincorporated community in Coffee County, Alabama, United States.

History
The community is named for the Batten family, who lived in the area.

References

Unincorporated communities in Coffee County, Alabama
Unincorporated communities in Alabama